Hanmer Springs is a small town in the Canterbury region of the South Island of New Zealand. The Māori name for Hanmer Springs is Te Whakatakanga o te Ngārahu o te ahi a Tamatea, which means “where the ashes of Tamate’s (sic) fire lay”, referring to Tamatea, the captain of the canoe Tākitimu.

The township lies at the base of Conical Hill. Mount Isobel looks over Hanmer Springs. Jacks Pass and Jollies Pass provide access to the Molesworth and Rainbow roads.

Toponymy 
The town is named after Thomas Hanmer, an owner of Hawkeswood Station near the Conway River during the 1850s. Thomas Hanmer was born in Hanmer, Wales. He arrived at Port Lyttleton in 1852. While searching for suitable farming land, he joined a party of surveyors working in the Amuri District. During this period he was linked with Hanmer Springs, although he never lived there. He was the manager of the St Leonards Station near Culverden from 1855 to 1857. He then moved to Queensland, Australia. There is a statue of Thomas Hanmer in the center of Hanmer Springs.

History
The locality was discovered for its hot springs by William Jones in early 1859. Access to the general area was provided by a bridge over the Waiau Uwha River in 1864 constructed by a Mr Handisides of Nelson for NZ£2,000 to a design by John Blackett. The bridge lasted only ten years before it was blown over by a Nor'west wind.

The hot springs were not included within that area. The springs themselves were still in their natural state at that time, with only steps and a changing shed provided. The Minister of Lands, William Rolleston, replied that it was important that the public should retain access to the springs. Surveyor Walter Kitson was instructed with laying out the site of the hot springs including an accommodation house. Construction of a bath house began in January 1884. The fifty year jubilee was held in 1933, stating that Hanmer had been a government resort since 1883, but the centenary book pointed out that the jubilee was held a year too early. The government investing significant funds into Hanmer Springs without a bridge crossing the Waiau Uwha River caused considerable controversy. Blackett designed a new bridge and John Anderson from Christchurch won the contract to erect it, and built a foundry at the site. This second bridge opened in 1887 and gives access to Hanmer to this day, with the structure registered as a Category I heritage item since 1983. The opening celebrations held by Anderson's sons at the site were rather liberal to the extent that the site is still known as Champagne Flat.

Demographics

Hanmer Springs

Hanmer Springs had a population of 960 at the 2018 New Zealand census, an increase of 120 people (14.3%) since the 2013 census, and an increase of 231 people (31.7%) since the 2006 census. There were 375 households. There were 480 males and 480 females, giving a sex ratio of 1.0 males per female. The median age was 41.9 years (compared with 37.4 years nationally), with 150 people (15.6%) aged under 15 years, 177 (18.4%) aged 15 to 29, 483 (50.3%) aged 30 to 64, and 150 (15.6%) aged 65 or older.

Ethnicities were 86.9% European/Pākehā, 5.9% Māori, 0.6% Pacific peoples, 8.8% Asian, and 3.4% other ethnicities (totals add to more than 100% since people could identify with multiple ethnicities).

The proportion of people born overseas was 29.7%, compared with 27.1% nationally.

Although some people objected to giving their religion, 56.6% had no religion, 31.2% were Christian, 1.2% were Hindu, 0.9% were Muslim, 0.6% were Buddhist and 4.1% had other religions.

Of those at least 15 years old, 168 (20.7%) people had a bachelor or higher degree, and 96 (11.9%) people had no formal qualifications. The median income was $35,300, compared with $31,800 nationally. The employment status of those at least 15 was that 498 (61.5%) people were employed full-time, 147 (18.1%) were part-time, and 6 (0.7%) were unemployed.

In 2018, there were 402 occupied private dwellings and a further 603 unoccupied private dwellings.

Hanmer Range
The statistical area of Hanmer Range surrounds but does not include Hanmer Springs.

Hanmer Range had a population of 261 at the 2018 New Zealand census, an increase of 12 people (4.8%) since the 2013 census, and an increase of 45 people (20.8%) since the 2006 census. There were 102 households. There were 141 males and 123 females, giving a sex ratio of 1.15 males per female. The median age was 45.3 years (compared with 37.4 years nationally), with 51 people (19.5%) aged under 15 years, 42 (16.1%) aged 15 to 29, 126 (48.3%) aged 30 to 64, and 42 (16.1%) aged 65 or older.

Ethnicities were 95.4% European/Pākehā, 6.9% Māori, 2.3% Asian, and 1.1% other ethnicities (totals add to more than 100% since people could identify with multiple ethnicities).

The proportion of people born overseas was 19.5%, compared with 27.1% nationally.

Although some people objected to giving their religion, 51.7% had no religion, 37.9% were Christian and 3.4% had other religions.

Of those at least 15 years old, 42 (20.0%) people had a bachelor or higher degree, and 33 (15.7%) people had no formal qualifications. The median income was $37,100, compared with $31,800 nationally. The employment status of those at least 15 was that 123 (58.6%) people were employed full-time and 39 (18.6%) were part-time.

Climate 
Hanmer Springs has temperatures that range between summer temperatures of an average daily high of 22 degrees Celsius and an average daily low of 9 degrees Celsius in January and February and winter temperatures with an average daily high of 9 degrees Celsius and an average daily low of 1 degree Celsius in July. Rainfall is highest on average in July with 107 mm and lowest in January with 55 mm Snow falls in Hanmer Springs in winter and often closes the road into Hanmer Springs. In summer, Hanmer Springs often has very hot summer conditions for New Zealand with temperatures getting above 35 degrees Celsius.

Hot pools

In 1960 the local community purchased the hot pools and gifted them to the local council. The three hexagonal pools which are still in use currently and a fresh water pool were built in 1978. Changing rooms and a new entrance way were constructed in 1985. The rock pools were built in 1992 and further sulphur pools constructed in 1999.

In 2009, a 4600 square meter extension to the hot pools complex was proposed including "a second [16m high] water-slide, ice-skating rink and relocating and reconfiguring the freshwater pool." During the consent process oppositions were made to it by, among others, the Queen Mary Reserve Trust concerning the expansions effect on noise levels and visual impact.  Concerns were also raised by former hospital superintendent, Dr Robert Crawford, about the change the development might have on the village's brand of "slow tourism and relaxation, not wet’n’wild."

After a hearing from independent Commissioner Robert Batty, on Monday, 18 January 2010 the proposal was approved.  "The freshwater pool, new buildings, water slide/super bowl and the aqua play/ ice skating area are all to be on land from the subdivision of Queen Mary Hospital land." Development had continued since then and Hanmer Springs currently has 22 pools and four water slides with the most recent: The Conical Thrill being opened in November 2019. The Hot Pools were further extended in November 2020 with a new area for younger children to play on including a new waterslide. The Hanmer Springs Hot Pools also was the winner in the Luxury Hot Springs category at the 2020 World Luxury Spa Awards. At peak times, the hot pools can play host to 5000 people each day.

Other tourism
Hanmer Springs is a tourist destination, and the town's population swells during holidays. Hanmer Springs has around 520,000 visitors each year.  Bungy jumping, jet boating, white water rafting, mountain biking and hiking are common tourist activities, and there is an airline service available for the viewing of the town's alpine surroundings. A Visitor Information Centre next to the hot springs provides information about the area and booking facilities for transport. Trampers can obtain weather information, maps and guidance from the Department of Conservation.

Accommodation options include the Hamner Springs Hotel, various motels and the Hamner Springs Retreat, a conference venue and accommodation complex near Hanmer Springs owned by the VR Group of hotels.

Budget accommodation includes a youth hostel.  Holiday homes are commonly rented out in Hanmer Springs.

The Hanmer Forest provides many walking trails. The Conical Hill walk ascends to the 550 meter summit and provides a panoramic view of Hanmer Springs. Western hemlock, Lawson’s Cypress, Japanese cypresses, giant fir, Atlas cedar, and laburnum can be seen on this walk all of which were planted around 1910. The Shelter at the summit provides protection from the weather. A plaque at the shelter commemorates the role of Duncan Rutherford (1853–1917) has had in Hanmer Springs. Longer walking trips up Mount Isobel are possible via a variety of tracks.

The Hanmer Springs Golf Club operates an eighteen hole golf course in Hanmer Springs at 133 Argelins Road. The Golf Course was founded in 1911.  The clubroom has a seating capacity of 100 guests with full bar and kitchen facilities. The Hanmer Springs Rugby Football Club plays in the North Canterbury Rugby Union. They often hold a preseason game between the Canterbury and Tasman Makos sides. A variety of other endurance sporting events are annually held in Hanmer Springs including the Mount Isobel Challenge, The Alpine Marathon, the 4 hour and 8 hour mountain bike races, Hanmer Half Marathon and the Christchurch to Hanmer Springs road cycling race run by the Pegasus Cycling Club.

Mini golf is popular in Hanmer Springs. There is a variety of restaurants in Hanmer Springs. An animal park is located in Hanmer Springs. It provides experiences aimed at younger children.

Hanmer Springs is a gateway to the St James Conservation Area for hiking, biking, water sports, skiing, hunting and horse riding. In July 2020, 

The New Zealand Government announced that it is investing more than $2 million to build a family-friendly twisting 850-metre long flying fox in Hanmer Springs. The ride is expected take nine minutes to complete and construction is expected to be finished by September 2021 The flying fox is expected to create 25 new jobs and provide $4 million revenue over the first five years. In May 2021, the resource consent application was suspended as planning showed that the ride would have to be modified due to the undulating hill side. Local residents objected to it in September 2021 saying that it "will ruin everything that is special about Conical Hill".

Hanmer Springs Forest 

In order to provide timber for the Christchurch market, reserve land was set aside between 1900 and 1901. The planting of exotic trees began in 1902, and in 1903 prison labour was used. The prisoners who took part in the planting resided at a nearby prison camp which operated until 1913. A variety of trees were planted including black pines, Norway spruce and deciduous larch, with alders in wet areas, and oaks and silver birches planted as amenity species. The oldest area of the forest (203 hectares) is protected under a Crown covenant. Many woody species have invaded this forest from the township’s gardens. In 1964 pupils of Hanmer Primary School planted a  block of pinus nigra in order to commemorate Arbor day. A number of walking trails now go through this mature forest.

In 2000, the Government sold the North Canterbury Crown Forests to Ngai Tahu as part of a Treaty of Waitangi settlement. Thus the Hanmer Springs Forests passed into private ownership. In 2008 a memorandum of understanding was signed by Matariki Forests, Hanmer Heritage Trust and the Hurunui District Council that protected the ongoing right for public access to the Hanmer Springs Forest. The Hurunui District Council would now be responsible for the maintenance of the tracks within the forest.

In 2018 an art trail of animal sculptures made from a redwood tree by Christchurch sculptor Andrew Lyons was opened.

Economy
The town is built around hot springs which originate in the fractured rock bed along the Hanmer fault. 

The Hanmer Springs' Queen Mary Hospital, formerly the South Island's leading rehabilitation center for sufferers of drug addiction, was closed in 2003. The premises were purchased by the Department of Conservation in 2008.

Transportation
Two daily shuttle bus companies travel from Hanmer Springs to Christchurch and back. The town is the gateway to the Molesworth station, Lake Tennyson and Rainbow station. During summer months, gravel roads through the Rainbow Valley to St Arnaud and the Nelson Lakes National Park, and through the Molesworth Station to Blenheim, Picton, and the Marlborough region are frequented by travelers, four-wheel drivers, and guided tour groups.

Ski fields 
There are two skifields in the Hanmer Springs area: the Hanmer Springs Ski Area and Mount Lyford. The Hanmer Springs Ski Area is run mostly by volunteers.

Mountain biking 
Hanmer Springs is well known for mountain biking. The St James Cycle Trail is part of Nga Haerenga The New Zealand Cycle Trail. The trail is located 13 km from Hanmer Springs over Jacks Pass. This mountain bike ride is a 57 km loop that a fit rider can do in a day. It is also possible to turn the ride into a longer adventure with the option of making it a two-day trip, stopping overnight in campsites or one of three huts. Work is starting in 2020 to extend the St James trail to Hanmer Springs.

There is an extensive network of mountain bike trails ranging from easy to expert runs in the forests surrounding Hanmer Springs. Alligator Alley, Upper Dog Stream, Detox and the Tank Track are particularly popular. The network of trails has been extended in 2020 with the addition of the Southern Cross and Tombstone trails. The four kilometre long Tombstone trail includes 185 metres of climbing to the highest point and a twisty 240 metre descent. The mountainbike trails have been described as "world class".

The Jacks Pass – Clarence River – Jollies Pass Loop is a 25 kilometer loop which is not technically challenging however it takes between two to four hours to complete. It can be ridden in either direction: West over Jacks Pass (869m) or East over Jollies Pass (850m). As the entire ride is at high elevation (700 meters above sea level) it is subject to extreme and sudden changes in the weather which have caught riders out who were not prepared.

Hanmer Springs is the starting point (or end point) for both the Molesworth Muster cycle trail and the Rainbow Trail. These are also part of Nga Haerenga The New Zealand Cycle Trail.

Notable buildings

The Banana House 
The Banana House was donated by FJ Savill who was the owner of St Helen's Station in the early 1920s. It was built in part by Bert Orange also known by some locals as Bertie Bananas. Between this and the shelter being next to a Monkey Puzzle Tree, the shelter became known as the Banana House. The original structure had glass windows but these were removed due to ongoing vandalism. The roof is made of aluminum with moulded corners and joints.

Queen Mary Hospital 

The Queen Mary Hospital for Sick and Wounded Soldiers was built on the site of the government sanatorium in Hanmer Springs. It was designed to encourage fresh air and sunlight. The Soldiers' Block was opened on 3 June 1916 by the Hon. G.W. Russell, the Minister of Public Health. The hospital remained under military control until 1922 when it was handed over to the Department of Health. Dr  Percy Chisholm continued as the medical superintendent.  The Chisholm Block was opened in 1926 to treat women with nervous disorders. The Nurses' Hostel was built in 1928 in a Georgian style. In the 1960s, it changed its focus to treat alcohol and drug dependency. It closed in 2003. In 2004 The Queen Mary Hospital (Former) and Hanmer Springs Thermal Reserve Historic Area was designated as a historic site by Heritage New Zealand. Within that area three buildings, the Soldiers' Block, Nurses' Home and Chisholm Block, were given Category I protection by Heritage New Zealand in 2005.

Hanmer Springs War Memorial Hall 
The War Memorial Hall was completed in 1961. It has a more recent extension that includes an art gallery, library and district council offices. Just outside it is a Gingko tree that was planted in 1964 by the governor-general, Brigadier Sir Bernard Fergusson.

Hanmer Springs Post Office 
The original Hanmer Springs Post Office was built in 1901 and is a Historic Place Category 2, listed in 1983. It is now used as a restaurant.

The Powerhouse 
The Powerhouse building was built to house a small hydro electric generator in 1926. The water was provided by the nearby Rogerson river. It provided electricity for the Queen Mary Hospital as well as a few street lights. In 1934 mains electricity lines connected Hanmer Springs to the electricity grid via Waipara. The Powerhouse is now a cafe.

The Hanmer Springs Hotel 
The Hanmer Springs Hotel, built in a Spanish Mission style was completed in 1932. It operated as the Heritage Hotel Hanmer until May 2020; when a combination of intense competition for holiday accommodation and Covid-19 meant that it closed temporarily following the withdrawal of the Heritage Hotels Group from management. The hotel was then purchased by the CPG hotel chain who reopened it in December 2020 with plans to further develop it as a five star resort in 2021.

Saint Andrews Presbyterian Church 
Saint Andrews was built in 1892. It had to be rebuilt the following year due to a "hurricane" causing significant damage to it. The manse at Hanmer Springs was completed in January 1902. It closed on 29 November 2015. A notice on the building (sited October 2020) states that the Church does not meet earthquake building regulations and warns people not to enter the building.

Church of the Epiphany 
The Church of the Epiphany is the Anglican Church in Hanmer Springs . It was listed as a Historic Place Category 2 in 1983. it was built in 1901 by Mr T W Berry of Blenheim.

Saint Rochs 
Saint Rochs is the Catholic Church in Hanmer Springs. It was listed as a Historic Place Category 2 in 1984.

Education

The school was first established in 1896. The original building was built in 1901 of "wood and iron".

Fauna 
There are numerous native species living in and around Hanmer Springs. These include keas, black-fronted tern (tarapirohe), banded dotterel (tūturiwhatu), rough gecko (moko kākāriki), South Island pied oystercatcher (tōrea), South Island robin (kakaruwai/ tōtōara), New Zealand falcon (kārearea), South Island tomtit (ngirungiru/ kōmiromiro), grey warbler (hōrirerire/riroriro), fantail (pīwakawaka), bellbird (tītapu/kōpara), New Zealand pigeon (kererū) amongst others.

There are also numerous introduced predators in and around Hanmer Springs including stoats, ferrets, rats, mice cats and possums for which Te Tihi o Rauhea Hanmer Springs Conservation Trust in partnership with the Department of Conservation are aiming to eliminate in order to support threatened native species.

Government 
Hanmer Springs is part of the Kaikoura electorate. The Hurunui District Council is the local government body responsible for providing services to Hanmer Springs.

Notes

References

External links

Official website

Spa towns in New Zealand
Hurunui District
Hot springs of New Zealand
Landforms of Canterbury, New Zealand
Populated places in Canterbury, New Zealand